The Men's 150 metre individual medley swimming events for the 2020 Summer Paralympics took place at the Tokyo Aquatics Centre on August 28, 2021. Athletes swim three 50 metre laps using the backstroke, breaststroke, and freestyle. A total of two events were contested over this distance.

Medal summary
The following is a summary of the medals awarded across all 150 metre individual medley events.

Results
The following were the results of the finals only of each of the Men's 150 metre individual medley events in each of the classifications. Further details of each event, including where appropriate heats and semi finals results, are available on that event's dedicated page.

SM3

The SM3 category is for swimmers who have leg or arm amputations, have severe coordination problems in their limbs, or have to swim with their arms but don't use their trunk or legs.

The final in this classification took place on 28 August 2021:

SM4

The SM4 category is for swimmers who have function in their hands and arms but can't use their trunk or legs to swim, or they have three amputated limbs.

The final in this classification took place on 28 August 2021:

References

Swimming at the 2020 Summer Paralympics